La Jeune Belgique (meaning The Young Belgium in English) was a Belgian literary society and movement that published a French-language literary review La Jeune Belgique between 1880 and 1897. Both the society and magazine were founded by the Belgian poet Max Waller. Contributors to the review included Georges Rodenbach, Eugene Demolder, Émile Verhaeren, Maurice Maeterlinck, Charles van Lerberghe, Albert Giraud, Georges Eekhoud, Camille Lemonnier and Auguste Jennart.

The magazine was started in 1880 under the name La Jeune revue littéraire which was changed to La Jeune Belgique in 1881. The headquarters of the magazine, which was published biweekly, was in Brussels. In its later year the frequency of the magazine became published monthly and then, bimonthly. In addition, the magazine was published both in Brussels and in Paris during this period.

References

External links
 Fin-de-Siècle Symbolist and Avant-Garde Periodicals

1880 establishments in Belgium
1897 disestablishments in Belgium
Avant-garde magazines
Monthly magazines published in Belgium
Biweekly magazines
Defunct literary magazines published in Europe
Defunct magazines published in Belgium
French-language magazines
Literary societies
Magazines established in 1880
Magazines disestablished in 1897
Magazines published in Paris
Magazines published in Brussels